LaSalle Doheny Leffall Jr. (May 22, 1930 – May 25, 2019) was an American surgeon, oncologist, and medical educator. Recognized as very committed to those he served and his profession, he served as the Charles R. Drew Professor of Surgery at Howard University College of Medicine and in leadership positions for several healthcare organizations. He served as president of the American Cancer Society and the American College of Surgeons.

Early life and education 
Leffall was born on May 22, 1930, in Tallahassee, Florida. His father was from a Texas family with ten other siblings. His father taught agriculture at Florida A&M College and was the principal of a racially segregated high school in Quincy, Florida, where Leffall grew up. 

As a child, Leffall had been successful in treating a wounded bird, which sparked his interest for medicine. He was 15 when he was graduated from high school. He and a classmate applied to Meharry Medical College and to Howard University College of Medicine. Due to a low score on the Medical College Admission Test Leffall had been rejected by Howard. When Leffall and his classmate had not heard back from either school, the president of Florida A&M, William Gray, spoke to the president at Howard and secured admission for both students. Leffall later stated in an interview, "If it had not been for Dr. Gray's taking that stance, there is no telling what would have happened."

In three years, he was awarded an undergraduate degree in Biology at Florida A&M at age 18, and with the interest he had in writing, he also was awarded an undergraduate degree in English at the same time. Leffall earned his medical degree in 1952, attending Howard at a time when Charles Drew was a faculty member there. 

In the 1950s, he spent several years in specialty training, having been mentored by Jack E. White, the first black physician to pursue training in surgical oncology at Memorial Sloan Kettering Cancer Center. While at Homer G. Phillips Hospital, Leffall completed his internship. 

After completing training at Memorial Sloan Kettering, while with the United States Army, Leffall spent a year in Munich. His role as a surgeon in Germany consisted of serving as Chief in the U.S. Army Hospital.

Career 
In 1962, Leffall joined the Howard faculty. By 1970, he was a full professor and chairman of Howard's surgery department. He earned his named professorship in 1992, as the first Charles R. Drew Faculty who performed surgery. 

Leffall performed surgery until the mid-2000s, completing 60 years in total. Although he stopped actively practicing medicine in 2013, he maintained his teaching and administrative involvement at the medical school. In May 2015, Howard held a special grand rounds session to honor Leffall's service to the school.

Leffall was the first African American president of both the American Cancer Society (1978) and the American College of Surgeons (1995). There was inequality between white and black Americans when it came to receiving healthcare and his leadership skills helped bring attention to the treatment and mortality in Black cancer patients. Specially, he formed a program focusing on the issue of cancer for Black Americans. He served as chairman of the board of directors for the Susan G. Komen Breast Cancer Foundation from 2002 to 2007 and for a few months in 2011 and 2012, as provost at Howard, before he resigned because of increasing responsibilities. He was on the board of directors of Mutual of America. The Society of Surgical Oncology also honored him, appointing Leffall as the first African American president of the organiztion. Throughout his career, he was able to speak to more than 200 medical colleges in and out of America. On top of that, he contributed to more than 100 books and articles, both as the original author and as a joint author. 

He received honorary degrees from Georgetown University, Amherst College, and several other colleges. He received a Candace Award for Science from the National Coalition of 100 Black Women in 1983. The 43rd President of the United States, George W. Bush, appointed Leffall to the President's Cancer Panel as a Chair holder. Howard University recognized Leffall for his impactful work throughout his time in the medical field, including the leadership he exercised in the medical societies.

Personal life and death 
Leffall met his wife, the former Ruth McWilliams, when he was a senior at Howard. Leffall and his wife had one son, LaSalle III, who became a Harvard-educated businessman. Leffall was a close friend of jazz musician Cannonball Adderley.

Leffall died of cancer on the evening of May 25, 2019 in Washington, D.C., survived by his wife Ruth, son LaSalle D. Leffall III, and sister Dolores Leffall.

References 

1930 births
2019 deaths
People from Tallahassee, Florida
Military personnel from Florida
Howard University faculty
American surgeons
Physicians from Florida
Howard University College of Medicine alumni
Florida A&M University alumni
American Cancer Society people
Members of the National Academy of Medicine